Alessandra Fratoni (born 30 December 1981) is a Brazilian female volleyball player, who played as a middle blocker.

She was part of the Brazil women's national volleyball team at the 2002 FIVB Volleyball Women's World Championship in Germany.

On club level she played with Sao Caetano E.C. and VK Baku at the 2012 CEV Women's Challenge Cup.

Clubs

References

External links 
 player profile FIVB
 player profile CEV

1981 births
Living people
Brazilian women's volleyball players
Place of birth missing (living people)
Middle blockers
Expatriate volleyball players in Italy
Expatriate volleyball players in Azerbaijan
Brazilian expatriates in Italy
Brazilian expatriate sportspeople in Azerbaijan